Andrés Gómez (born 1960) is a former professional tennis player from Ecuador.

Andrés Gómez may also refer to:

 Andrés Gómez (actor) (born 1993), Venezuelan actor, model and singer
 Andrés Gómez (basketball) (1913–1991), Mexican basketball player
 Andrés Gómez (field hockey) (born 1962), Spanish former field hockey player
 Andrés Gómez (footballer) (born 2002), Colombian professional footballer 
 Andrés Vicente Gómez (born 1943), Spanish film producer